Quercus ithaburensis subsp. macrolepis, the Valonia oak, is a subspecies of Quercus ithaburensis, a member of the beech family, Fagaceae. It may also be treated as a separate species, Quercus macrolepis.

Taxonomy 
The Valonia oak was first described as the species Quercus macrolepis by Carl Friedrich Kotschy in 1860. It was reduced to a subspecies of Quercus ithaburensis in 1981. Within the oak genus, Q. ithaburensis is classified in the subgenus Cerris, section Cerris, which includes Quercus cerris, the Turkey oak, and related species. It is most closely related to Quercus brantii, Brant's oak.

Distribution
Quercus ithaburensis subsp. macrolepis is native from south-east Italy, through the Balkans (Albania, Bulgaria, former Yugoslavia) and Greece, including Crete and the East Aegean Islands), to the eastern Mediterranean (Turkey, Lebanon and Syria. It is absent from the Palestine region, where only the subspecies ithaburensis occurs.

Uses

The cups, known as valonia, are used for tanning and dyeing as are the unripe acorns called camata or camatina. The ripe acorns are eaten raw or boiled.

See also
 Valoneic acid

References

ithaburensis macrolepis
Flora of Albania
Flora of Bulgaria
Flora of the East Aegean Islands
Flora of Greece
Flora of Italy
Flora of Crete
Flora of Lebanon and Syria
Flora of Turkey
Flora of European Turkey
Flora of Yugoslavia
Trees of Europe
Trees of Mediterranean climate